Litchville-Marion School District No. 46 is a school district headquartered in Marion, North Dakota. It has an elementary school in Litchville and a secondary school in Marion.

In the 1993–1994 school year the Litchville and Marion school districts decided to do a trial where the two districts had all elementary students in Litchville and all secondary students in Marion. In 2002 the two school districts permanently merged.  it had 77 elementary and 53 secondary students.

It includes sections of Barnes, LaMoure, Ransom, and Stutsman counties.

References

External links
 Litchville-Marion School District No. 46
School districts in North Dakota
Education in Barnes County, North Dakota
LaMoure County, North Dakota
Ransom County, North Dakota
Education in Stutsman County, North Dakota
2002 establishments in North Dakota
Educational institutions established in 2002